Isabella Bank is a village in Belize District in  Belize, Central America. It is located on the banks of the Belize River approximately two miles from the village of Bermudian Landing. It can be reached by traveling the Northern Highway out of Belize City to the junction of the road that branches into Burrell Boom (a large village). There is a paved road from Burrell Boom to Isabella Bank. Isabella Bank is well known for having a very respected private primary school- Isabella Harmony Private School. This prestigious village has a small but well respected population of 130 individuals.
The central and outlying a bunnger 
age are located in pine ridge type terrain with very light, sandy, soil. Closer to the river the soil becomes a heavier clay, which supports thicker vegetation. 
Traditionally a farming community using slash and burn methods, there has been largely a transition to a workforce that commutes to larger metropolitan areas (i.e.:Belize City) as day laborers. 
This has been particularly evident in the younger portion of the populace.
As of 2016, the village was connected to the pipe water system operated by Belize Water Services. (BWS)
Residents also benefit from grid electric service provided by Belize Electricity Limited. (BEL)
A number of residents have cleared acreage
where they raise livestock including cattle and sheep.
There is currently no store or shop operating in the village, but supplies are readily available at shops in nearby Bermudian Landing and Scotland Halfmoon. 
Public transportation includes a number of local bus lines serving surrounding villages and connecting with Belize City.

References

Populated places in Belize District
Belize Rural North